William Montague may refer to:

 William Pepperell Montague (1873–1953), philosopher
 William Montague (cleric) (1757–1833), Anglican minister from Boston and Dedham, Massachusetts

See also
 William Montagu (disambiguation)